James Roundell (born 23 October 1951) is an English former first-class cricketer.

The son of Ann and Charles Roundell, he was born at Nantwich in October 1951. He was educated at Winchester College, before going up to Magdalene College, Cambridge. While studying at Cambridge, he played first-class cricket for Cambridge University Cricket Club in 1973, making ten appearances. Playing as a medium-fast bowler in the Cambridge side, he took 9 wickets at an average of 56.55, with best figures of 3 for 12. As a tailend batsman, he scored 36 runs with a highest score of 10 not out.

References

External links

1951 births
Living people
People from Nantwich
People educated at Winchester College
Alumni of Magdalene College, Cambridge
English cricketers
Cambridge University cricketers